"One More Chance" is a song by American singer-songwriter Michael Jackson. It was written by R. Kelly and included on Jackson's compilation album Number Ones, released on November 22, 2003. The song was later included on the Australian, French, Swedish and Indonesian editions of King of Pop and the Japanese limited edition of The Ultimate Collection box set.

"One More Chance" was the last original single released during Jackson's lifetime. It received a positive reception from music critics and reached the top ten in Italy. It also reached number 5 in the UK. The song also managed to reach the top 30 in Germany, the Netherlands, and Switzerland, and peaked at number 83 on the US Billboard Hot 100.

Music video
Directed by Nick Brandt, Jackson had been shooting the music video late into the night of November 17, 2003 at CMX Studios in Las Vegas, Nevada, but production was stopped following a raid on the Neverland Ranch by the Santa Barbara County Sheriff's Office in relation to allegations of child sex abuse by Jackson. The single was instead promoted using a montage video of highlights from Jackson's career.

On October 13, 2010, the official website of Michael Jackson announced that the music video would be finished with what footage they had available, and was released in a deluxe DVD box set Michael Jackson's Vision on November 22, 2010. A rough two-minute cut of the video leaked online on November 15, 2010. On November 19, 2010, the full length of the video premiered on Jackson's official website. As with the song being the last brand new single released during his lifetime, the music video is also Jackson's last music video and the only with new footage to be released posthumously. The video begins with a group of people walking onto a stage. The curtain opens to reveal a cafe that Jackson starts dancing in with the group of people watching, revealing they were what brought him the same joy and vice-versa.

Track listing

US 12" vinyl
A1. "One More Chance" (Metro Remix) – 3:50
A2. "One More Chance" (Paul Oakenfold Urban Mix) – 3:37
B1. "One More Chance" (Paul Oakenfold Mix) – 3:50
B2. "One More Chance" (Ron G Club Remix) – 4:00
B3. "One More Chance" (album version) – 3:50

US CD maxi single
 "One More Chance" (album version) – 3:50
 "One More Chance" (Paul Oakenfold Mix) – 3:50
 "One More Chance" (Metro Remix) – 3:50
 "One More Chance" (Ron G Club Remix) – 4:00
 "One More Chance" (Paul Oakenfold Urban Mix) – 3:37

US 12" promo vinyl
A1. "One More Chance" (album version) – 3:50
A2. "One More Chance" (Ron G Club Remix) – 4:00
B1. "One More Chance" (Paul Oakenfold Urban Mix) – 3:37
B2. "One More Chance" (Paul Oakenfold Mix) – 3:50
B3. "One More Chance" (Night & Day R&B Mix) – 3:36

Canada CD single
 "One More Chance" (album version) – 3:50
 "One More Chance" (Ron G. Rhythmic Mix) – 3:50
 "One More Chance" (Paul Oakenfold Pop Mix) – 3:45

European CD maxi single
 "One More Chance" (album version) – 3:50
 "One More Chance" (Paul Oakenfold Mix) – 3:50
 "One More Chance" (Metro Remix) – 3:50
 "One More Chance" (Ron G Club Remix) – 4:00

European promo CD single
 "One More Chance" – 3:50

UK CD single (CD1)
 "One More Chance" (album version) – 3:50
 "One More Chance" (Paul Oakenfold Urban Mix) – 3:37

UK CD single (CD2)
 "One More Chance" (album version) – 3:50
 "One More Chance" (Paul Oakenfold Mix) – 3:50
 "One More Chance" (Metro Remix) – 3:50
 "One More Chance" (Ron G Club Remix) – 4:00

UK promo 12" vinyl
A1. "One More Chance" (Paul Oakenfold Urban Mix) – 3:37
B1. "One More Chance" (Ron G Club Remix) – 4:00
B2. "One More Chance" (album version) – 3:50

UK 12" vinyl
A1. "One More Chance" (Metro Remix) – 3:50
A2. "One More Chance" (Paul Oakenfold Urban Mix) – 3:37
B1. "One More Chance" (Paul Oakenfold Mix) – 3:50
B2. "One More Chance" (Ron G Club Remix) – 4:00
B3. "One More Chance" (album version) – 3:50

UK limited edition 12" vinyl picture disc
A. "One More Chance" (album version) – 3:50
B. "Billie Jean" (album version) – 4:54

Germany mini CD
 "One More Chance" (album version) – 3:50
 "Ben" (2003 live edit) – 2:45

Official remixes

 R. Kelly Remix
 Ron G Club Mix
 Ron G. Rhythmic Mix
 Slang Remix
 Slang Electro Remix
 Metro Remix

 Ford Remix
 Ford Extended Remix
 Paul Oakenfold Urban Mix
 Paul Oakenfold Mix
 Paul Oakenfold Pop Mix
 Night and Day Remix

Credits and personnel

 Written and arranged by R. Kelly
 Produced by R. Kelly and Michael Jackson
 Lead vocals by Michael Jackson
 Background vocals by Michael Jackson and R. Kelly
 Vocals recorded by Brad Buxer and John Nettlesby
 Mixed by Șerban Ghenea

 Digital editing by John Nettlesby
 String arrangement by Michael Jackson
 Guitar by Donnie Lyle
 Additional Pro-Tools by John Hanes
 Assistant engineer: Tim Roberts
 Mastered by Bernie Grundman

Charts

References

2003 singles
2003 songs
Michael Jackson songs
Music videos directed by Nick Brandt
Songs written by R. Kelly
Song recordings produced by Michael Jackson
Song recordings produced by R. Kelly
Pop ballads
Contemporary R&B ballads
2000s ballads